The Littorio class, also known as the Vittorio Veneto class, was a class of battleship of the Regia Marina, the Italian navy. The class was composed of four ships—, and —but only the first three ships of the class were completed. Built between 1934 and 1942, they were the most modern battleships used by Italy during World War II. The class's design was considered by the Spanish Navy, but the outbreak of World War II interrupted construction plans.

The first two ships, Littorio and Vittorio Veneto, were operational by the early months of Italy's participation in World War II. They formed the backbone of the Italian fleet, and conducted several sorties into the Mediterranean to intercept British convoys, though without any notable success. The two ships were repeatedly torpedoed throughout their careers: Littorio was hit by a torpedo during the attack on Taranto in November 1940 and again in June 1942;  Vittorio Veneto was torpedoed during the Battle of Cape Matapan in March 1941 and while escorting a convoy to North Africa in September 1941. Roma joined the fleet in June 1942, although all three ships remained inactive in La Spezia until June 1943, when all three were damaged in a series of Allied air attacks on the harbor.

In September 1943, Italy capitulated and signed an Armistice with the Allies. Littorio was then renamed Italia. The three active battleships were transferred to Malta before they were to be interned in Alexandria. While en route to Malta, German bombers attacked the fleet with Fritz X radio-guided bombs, damaging Italia and sinking Roma. Nevertheless, Italia and Vittorio Veneto reached Malta and were interned. The incomplete Impero was seized by the Germans after Italy withdrew from the war and used as a target, until she was sunk by American bombers in 1945. Italia and Vittorio Veneto were awarded to the United States and Britain, respectively, as war prizes. Italia, Vittorio Veneto, and Impero were broken up for scrap between 1952 and 1954.

Design
The Washington Naval Treaty of 1922 allotted Italy an additional  of total capital ship tonnage, which could be used in 1927–1929, while other powers were observing the "holiday" in battleship construction prescribed by the treaty. France, which was given parity with Italy, also possessed 70,000 tons of capital ship tonnage. Both countries were put under significant pressure from the other signatories to use their allotted tonnage to build smaller battleships with reduced caliber main batteries. The first Italian design, prepared in 1928, called for a  ship armed with a main battery of six  guns in twin turrets. They opted for this design because this allowed three ships under the 70,000-ton limit. This would have allowed the Italian fleet to keep at least two units operational at any given time. Protection and radius of action were sacrificed for speed and heavy armament, though the Italians did not value range, as they operated primarily in the confined waters of the Mediterranean.

At least one of these ships would have followed the three 23,000-ton ships once the building holiday expired in 1931. Funding was not allocated to begin construction, however, as the Italian Navy did not want to instigate an arms race with the French Navy. The London Naval Treaty of 1930 extended the building holiday to 1936, though Italy and France retained the right to build 70,000 tons of new capital ships. After 1930, the Italian Navy abandoned the smaller designs altogether. By 1930, Germany had begun to build the three  ships, armed with six  guns, and France had in turn laid down two s to counter them. The French vessels were armed with eight  guns. In late 1932, Italian constructors responded with a design similar to the Deutschland class, but armed with six  guns in triple turrets on a  displacement.

The Italian Navy decided that the smaller design was impractical, and that a larger design should be pursued. A  design was then prepared, which mounted eight 343 mm guns in twin turrets. This was ultimately abandoned in favor of a 35,000 ton design to be armed with 406 mm guns. The 406 mm gun in turn was abandoned in favor of the 381 mm gun because there were no designs for the larger gun, which would delay construction; a 381 mm gun had already been designed for the canceled . Nevertheless, by the time these ships entered service, the international arms control system had fallen apart and the major naval powers had invoked the "escalator clause" that allowed for ships up to  displacement.

General characteristics

The ships of the class varied slightly in dimensions. As Impero was not completed, her final displacement is unknown. As built, the ships were fitted with bulbous bows to increase their speed, but they were found to cause serious vibration, which forced a modification to the bow.

Littorio and Vittorio Veneto had a standard crew of 80 officers and 1,750 enlisted men; while serving as a flagship, the crew was increased by a command staff of between 11 and 31 additional officers. The standard crew for Roma and Impero was increased by 100 enlisted men. Aircraft facilities were located on the quarterdeck, where it was initially planned to base six La Cierva autogyros. Instead, a single catapult was fitted. The ships were equipped with three Ro.43 reconnaissance seaplanes or navalized Re.2000 fighters. The Re.2000 fighter was a wheeled aircraft and had to land on an airfield.

The ships' propulsion system consisted of four Belluzzo geared steam turbines powered by eight oil-fired Yarrow boilers. On sea trials, both Littorio and Vittorio Veneto exceeded the design specifications for their power plant. In service, however, the ships averaged . Figures for Romas speed trials have not been recorded. The entire machinery system accounted for about 5.6 percent of the total displacement.

Armament

The ships' main battery consisted of nine 381 mm L/50 Ansaldo 1934 guns in three triple turrets, two in a superfiring pair forward and one aft. These long-barrel, high-velocity guns were chosen to compensate for the smaller 381 mm shell as compared to the 406 mm gun originally desired. The  semi-armor piercing shells formed the secondary ammunition of the 381mm/50, which had a  bursting charge. Although high explosive shells weighing  were developed for the 381 mm guns, they never saw service on the Littorio-class. Shell rooms were located below the propellant magazines beneath the gun house in the turret structure. The guns' rate of fire was one shot every 45 seconds. Their ammunition load was 495 AP shells and 171 SAP shells, with 4,320 propellant charges (666 rounds total, or 74 rounds per gun split 55 AP & 19 SAP).

The ships' secondary battery consisted of twelve  L/55 Ansaldo Model 1934 guns in four triple turrets. Two were placed abreast the No. 2 main battery turret and two on either side of the rear turret. They had a rate of fire of slightly better than four rounds a minute. Four  L/40 guns were mounted on each ship in order to fire illumination rounds. The ships' anti-aircraft armament was composed of a powerful battery of twelve 90 mm (3.5 in) L/50 guns closely arranged amidships, twenty  L/54 guns, and sixteen  L/65 guns. The 90 mm guns provided long-range anti-aircraft protection, and were mounted in quadriaxially stabilized single turrets.

Armor

The belt consists of a  homogeneous armor outer plate and the  cemented armor belt placed  behind the outer plate; the 250 mm gap was filed with a cement foam called "Cellulite" to keep the water out of the gap and assist in de-capping armor piercing shells. A  homogeneous armor plate was placed  behind the belt, followed  behind by another  plate sloped 26º in the opposite direction. The main citadel was closed off by  forward and  aft traverse bulkheads. The hull space above the citadel was an armored casemate with  plating. The bow was protected by a  belt that extends  ahead of the main belt before terminating in a  transverse bulkhead. The propeller shafts, aft diesel generator groups, and steering gear were protected by  homogeneous armor plating and a separate  bulkhead aft of the citadel.

The weather deck over the citadel consists of  homogeneous armor over  plating; the main armor deck varied depending on the space it was protecting.

The main battery turrets were protected by  cemented armor faces,  forward sides and roof,  rear sides,  rear roof, and  rear. Below the third deck, neither the primary nor secondary barbettes were protected by armor. The 90-mm heavy anti-aircraft mounts were protected by  shield and barbette plating.

The conning tower was in the same style as the others designed by General Pugliese. The lower two levels had  and  respectively, all mounted on  plating. The roof  on 10-mm plating. An internal  armored tube protected important electrical cables and pipes for hydraulic systems.

Pugliese torpedo defense system

All four ships incorporated a unique underwater protection system named after its designer, Umberto Pugliese. A 40 mm thick torpedo bulkhead extended inboard from the base of the main belt before curving down to meet the bottom of the hull. The drum ran the length of the torpedo defense system, and was designed to collapse to contain the explosive pressure of a torpedo hit. The torpedo bulkhead would prevent any splinters or explosive effects from entering the ships' vitals.

The system did not perform as effectively as expected, however. This was due to two major defects in the design. The riveted joint that connected the interior torpedo bulkhead to the bottom of the hull was not strong enough to sustain the tremendous shear loadings associated with direct contact explosions. The joints failed even in cases of non-contact explosions, which prevented the hollow drum from collapsing as designed and resulted in massive flooding. The ability of the drum to absorb explosive shock correspondingly fell in relation to its size.

Construction

The keels for Vittorio Veneto and Littorio were laid on the same day, 28 October 1934, at the Cantieri Riuniti dell'Adriatico shipyard in Trieste and the Ansaldo shipyard in Genoa, respectively. Vittorio Veneto was launched on 22 July 1937, with Littorio following exactly one month later on 22 August. While incomplete, Vittorio Veneto went to sea on 23 October 1939 to conduct machinery trials. She was delivered to the Italian Navy in Trieste, still incomplete, some six months later on 28 April 1940. She departed Trieste on 1 May for final fitting out at the dockyard in La Spezia. After completion on 15 May 1940, she went to Taranto to join the fleet. Littorio underwent the same pattern of machinery trials prior to completion; she was delivered to the fleet on 6 May 1940.

Two additional ships were laid down four years later. Roma was built by the CRDA shipyard, starting on 18 September 1938. She was launched on 9 June 1940 and was completed on 14 June 1942, after which she joined the fleet in La Spezia and replaced Littorio as the fleet flagship. Impero was laid down at the Ansaldo shipyard on 14 May 1938. She was launched on 15 November 1939, but she was never completed. After the entrance of Italy to World War II, the Italian Navy moved the unfinished ship from Genoa to Brindisi, out of fears of French attacks on the vessel. Work was not resumed.

Ships

Service history

Littorio and Vittorio Veneto were declared operational on 2 August 1940, and were assigned to the 9th Division of the 1st Squadron. On 31 August, the two ships, along with three of the older battleships steamed with a force of ten cruisers and thirty-one destroyers to engage the Operation Hats convoy, but poor reconnaissance prevented the Italian force from engaging the British ships. The ships made another unsuccessful sortie to attack another Malta convoy on 29 September. During the attack on Taranto  on 12 November 1940, Littorio was hit twice by torpedoes, suffering serious damage. Significant flooding caused the ship to settle by the bow. The ship was dry-docked on 11 December, with repairs completed by 11 March 1941. Vittorio Veneto, however, emerged from the attack undamaged. While her sister was being repaired, she took over flagship duties and was transferred to Naples.

Vittorio Veneto sortied on 26 November and encountered British forces south of Sardinia. During the resulting Battle of Cape Spartivento, Swordfish torpedo bombers from the carrier  attacked Vittorio Veneto, though she evaded the torpedoes. She briefly engaged British cruisers with her rear main battery turret, without scoring any hits. During the engagement, one of her Ro.43 reconnaissance planes was shot down by a Skua fighter. On the night of 8–9 January 1941, the Royal Air Force attacked Naples with heavy bombers, but failed to hit the ship. In February, Vittorio Veneto,  and  attempted to attack what was believed to be a Malta convoy. The British squadron was in fact Force H, steaming to bombard Genoa. The two fleets did not make contact, however, and the Italians returned to port.

On 26 March 1941, Vittorio Veneto departed port to attack British convoys to Greece. Germany pressured the Italian Navy to begin the operation, under the impression that they had disabled two of the three battleships assigned to the British Mediterranean Fleet. This resulted in the Battle of Cape Matapan the following day, during which Vittorio Veneto engaged British cruisers. Repairs lasted until July.

Littorio and Vittorio Veneto had both returned to active duty by August 1941, and on the 22nd the two ships sortied to attack a convoy. They returned to port without encountering any British forces, however. On 26 September, the two battleships attempted to intercept the Operation Halberd convoy, but they broke off the operation without attacking the convoy. While escorting a convoy to North Africa, Vittorio Veneto was torpedoed by the British submarine ; repairs lasted until Spring, 1942. Shortly thereafter, on 13 December, Littorio escorted another convoy to North Africa. This operation resulted in the First Battle of Sirte, which ended inconclusively. She provided distant cover to another convoy on 3–6 January 1942. On 21 March, Littorio sortied to attack a British convoy, which led to the Second Battle of Sirte.

Repairs to Vittorio Veneto were completed in time for her to join Littorio on attacks on the convoys Vigorous and Harpoon, which had departed Alexandria and Gibraltar to reinforce Malta simultaneously in mid-June. Combat was limited to the opposing light forces, and Littorio and Vittorio Veneto did not see action; the British nevertheless broke off Operation Vigorous due to the battleships' presence and heavy air attacks. While returning to port, Littorio was hit by a bomb from an American B-24 Liberator heavy bomber; the bomb struck the forward gun turret, though it did minimal damage. Before returning to port, a British Wellington bomber torpedoed the ship. The torpedo struck her starboard bow, though she returned to port. Repairs were completed and on 12 December, both ships were moved from Taranto to La Spezia in response to the Allied landings in North Africa. Roma joined the fleet shortly after the attacks on the two convoys, and joined her sisters for the move to La Spezia. There, she replaced Littorio as the fleet flagship.

In June 1943, a series of Allied air raids attacked La Spezia in an attempt to neutralize the three battleships. On 5 June, Vittorio Veneto was hit by two large bombs that struck her port side. She was transferred to Genoa for repairs, which were not completed before the Armistice that ended Italian participation in the war. Littorio was hit by three bombs on 19 June, a week after her sister was damaged. She was renamed Italia after Benito Mussolini's regime collapsed. Roma was damaged during the 5 June attack and again in a third attack on 23 June. In September 1943, following the withdrawal of Italy from the war, all three ships and a significant portion of the Italian fleet left port to be interned in Malta. While en route, German bombers laden with Fritz X radio-guided bombs attacked the formation. One hit Italia in the bow forward the main battery turrets, causing serious damage. Two hit Roma; one passed through the ship and exploded under her keel, and the second hit near the forward magazines. The bomb detonated the magazines, causing a massive explosion that destroyed the ship with heavy casualties.

Italia and Vittorio Veneto reached Malta, where they remained until 14 September, when they were transferred to Alexandria. They remained at the Great Bitter Lake in the Suez Canal for the rest of the war. On 6 June 1946, Vittorio Veneto steamed to Augusta in Sicily, where, under the Treaty of Peace with Italy, she was allocated to Britain. On 14 October 1946, she was moved to La Spezia, paid off on 3 January 1948, and broken up for scrap. Italia left Great Bitter Lake on 5 February 1947, to join her sister in Augusta. Allocated to the United States, she was stricken on 1 June 1948 and scrapped in La Spezia. The incomplete Impero had meanwhile been seized by the retreating Germans in 1943, who used her as a target, until she was sunk by American bombers on 20 February 1945. In October 1947, the ship was raised and towed to Venice, where she was broken up.

The Littorio design in foreign navies
In 1939, Spain's General Francisco Franco briefly considered a naval building program after seizing power in the Spanish Civil War. Franco concluded several agreements with the Italian government that would have seen the building of four Littorio-class battleships in Spain. The Italians promised to provide all necessary technical and material support for the construction of the ships. The Italian Navy pushed to modernize and enlarge the existing shipyards in Spain, so that they could handle a vessel as large as the Littorio class. The project was abandoned after Italy became involved in World War II, and as a result of limited Spanish industrial capacity.

In the early 1930s, the Soviet Navy began a naval construction program, and sought advice from foreign shipbuilders for a new class of battleships. On 14 July 1939, Ansaldo completed a design proposal for the Soviet Navy, for a ship largely based on the Littorio class, designated U.P. 41. The design was for a  ship armed with nine 406 mm guns in triple turrets. The Italians did not disclose the specifications of the Pugliese system and instead used a multiple-torpedo-bulkhead system. Regardless, the Soviet Navy did not use the U.P. 41 design as the basis for the s they laid down in the late 1930s. They were, however, equipped with the Pugliese system, the details of which were revealed through Soviet espionage.

In preparing the design for the Design 1047 type of battlecruisers in early 1940, the Dutch Navy inspected Vittorio Veneto, then under construction, in hopes of gathering some experience on the underwater protection system. The Italians refused to disclose the details of the Pugliese system.

Endnotes

Notes

Citations

References

Further reading

External links
 Classe Littorio Marina Militare website

Battleship classes